Alexander Moiseevich Olevskii (born February 12, 1939, in Moscow) is a Russian-Israeli mathematician at Tel Aviv University, specializing in mathematical analysis. As of July 2021, he is a professor emeritus.

He graduated in 1963 with a Candidate of Sciences degree (PhD) from Moscow State University. There he received in 1966 a Russian Doctor of Sciences degree (habilitation).  At the Moscow Institute of Electronics and Mathematics, he was from 1988 to 1992 head of the department of algebra and analysis. In the spring of 1996 he was at the Institute for Advanced Study. He has held visiting appointments at universities or institutes in several countries, including France, Australia, Germany, Italy, and the United States.

In 1986 Olevskii was an invited speaker at the International Congress of Mathematicians in Berkeley, California. He was a member of the 2013 Class of Fellows of the American Mathematical Society (announced in 2012). In 2014 he was an invited speaker at the European Congress of Mathematics in Kraków.

His doctoral students include Gady Kozma.

Selected publications
 
 
 
 }
 
  2004

References

External links
  (publication list)
 

1939 births
Living people
Soviet mathematicians
Israeli mathematicians
Moscow State University alumni
Academic staff of the Moscow Institute of Electronics and Mathematics
Academic staff of Tel Aviv University
Functional analysts
Mathematical analysts
Operator theorists
Soviet Jews
Soviet emigrants to Israel
Israeli people of Russian-Jewish descent
Fellows of the American Mathematical Society